The Registrum Gregorii is a collection of letters by pope Gregory the Great. It was commissioned by Egbert of Trier from the anonymous Italian artist known as the "master of the Registrum Gregorii" (fl. c. 980–996), probably after the death of Otto II, Holy Roman Emperor in 983.

The manuscript was separated: Two pages show one illuminated miniature each - one shows Otto II enthroned and surrounded by the four provinces of his empire (now held at the Musée Condé in Chantilly, France), and the other shows pope Gregory the Great writing whilst receiving inspiration from the Holy Spirit in the form of a dove perched on his shoulder (now held at the Stadtbibliothek at Trier).

The other parts of the manuscripts are held at the Stadtbibliothek at Trier: one double page with a dedicated poem, and a fragment of the original text (37 pages).

The Trier manuscript was bound in the 18th century.

See also 

 Epistolae Vagantes

Christian illuminated manuscripts
10th-century illuminated manuscripts
Illuminated manuscripts of the Musée Condé
Ottonian illuminated manuscripts
Collections of letters